FCMOV is a floating point conditional move opcode of the Intel x86 architecture, first introduced in Pentium Pro processors. It copies the contents of one of the floating point stack register, depending on the contents of EFLAGS integer flag register, to the ST(0) (top of stack) register. There are 8 variants of the instruction selected by the condition codes that need be set for the instruction to perform the move.

Similar to the CMOV instruction, FCMOV allows some conditional operations to be performed without the usual branching overhead. However, it has a higher latency than conditional branch instructions. Therefore, it is most useful for simple yet unpredictable comparison or conditional operations, where it can provide substantial performance gains.

The instruction is usually used with the FCOMI instruction or the FCOM-FSTSW-SAHF idiom to set the relevant condition codes based on the result of a floating point comparison.

Variants
This table shows the variants of the FCMOV instructions. The first operand is always the ST(0) register (equivalently, the top of the floating point stack). The Opcode column indicates a two-byte sequence where the second byte is a base value indicating the number of the floating point stack register to use for the second operand. Add the desired number to complete the corresponding opcode value.

References

External links
 Software Optimization Resources
 Intel's official instruction set reference download page

X86 instructions